El Balazo (English: The Bullet Shot) is the tenth studio album by Dominican singer Antony Santos.

Track listing

Cover
Alegre Conga is a cover of a song originally from Trio Matamoros.

Charts

References 

2001 albums
Antony Santos albums
Latin music albums
Spanish-language albums